Candolleomyces candolleanus (formerly known as Psathyrella candolleana) is mushroom in the family Psathyrellaceae. It is commonly found growing in small groups around stumps and tree roots on lawns and pastures in Europe and North America. In 2014, it was reported from Iraq. The coloring varies between white and golden brown. The cap margin is irregular and radially asymmetrical—a defining characteristic of this species. It can retain veil fragments on the edge and center. The spore print is purple-brown, while spores are smooth and elliptical, measuring 6.5–8 by 4–5 µm. The specific epithet candolleanus honors Swiss botanist Augustin Pyramus de Candolle.

While it is edible and may have a good flavor, it is not recommended due to its thin flesh, alleged poor culinary value and consistency, as well as difficulty in identification.

One similar species is Psathyrella gracilis. Some species may have darker caps when young, drying to match that of P. candolleana.

See also
List of Psathyrella species

References

External link

Psathyrellaceae
Edible fungi
Fungi described in 1818
Fungi of Asia
Fungi of Europe
Fungi of North America
Taxa named by Elias Magnus Fries